Hitachi Ibaraki Soccer Club is a Japanese football club based in Ibaraki. The club has played in Japan Soccer League Division 2.

External links
Football of Japan

Football clubs in Japan
Japan Soccer League clubs
1923 establishments in Japan
Association football clubs established in 1923
Sports teams in Ibaraki Prefecture
Hitachi
Works association football clubs in Japan